Jordan Pierre Ayew (born 11 September 1991) is a Ghanaian professional footballer who plays as a forward for  club Crystal Palace and the Ghana national team. 

He is the son of former Ghana captain Abedi Pele and brother of fellow players André and Ibrahim Ayew. Born in Marseille, Ayew was raised in France and started his career with Lyon Duchère before joining the Marseille academy in 2006. 

Ayew made his debut for the Ghana national team in 2010 and has earned over 80 caps. He has played in two FIFA World Cups (2014 and 2022), as well as five Africa Cup of Nations (2012, 2015, 2017, 2019 and 2021), helping them finish runners-up in 2015.

Club career

Marseille

Ayew joined Marseille as a trainee in 2006. He signed a three-year professional contract with Marseille in 2009. Jordan Ayew made his debut for the senior team on 16 December 2009 in a league match, scoring the equaliser against Lorient. Marseille went on to win the match 2–1.
Ayew scored his second goal against Nice at the Stade Vélodrome on 27 April 2011 in a match which saw his elder brother André Ayew score a hat-trick. On 1 November 2011, Jordan and André both started a UEFA Champions League match for the first time against Premier League giants Arsenal.

On 6 January 2014, he joined Ligue 1 rivals Sochaux on a loan deal until the end of the 2013–14 season.

Lorient
On 28 July 2014, Ayew signed a four-year contract with Lorient. Ayew explained the style and quality of play that Lorient proposed was the reason behind the decision.

Aston Villa
On 27 July 2015, Ayew joined Aston Villa on a five-year deal for an undisclosed fee, reported to be in the region of £8 million. He scored his first goal for the club on 24 October 2015 against his elder brother's club, Swansea City, in the 62nd minute. Aston Villa were relegated at the end of the 2015–16 season, winning only 17 points, but Ayew did end the season as their top scorer, albeit with just seven goals.

Swansea City

2016–17 season 

On 31 January 2017, Jordan Ayew joined Swansea City until the end of the 2019–20 season in exchange for Welsh International defender Neil Taylor, plus a fee from Swansea that can rise to £5 million if undisclosed future conditions are met. Jordan's elder brother was a Swansea City player during the 2015–16 season and later joined him in the winter transfer window of 2018. On 12 February 2017, he made his debut in a 2–0 victory over Leicester City after coming on in the 72nd minute for Fernando Llorente. In the final match of the season, Ayew scored his debut goal for Swansea by scoring the first goal,  an equalizer which led to a their 2–1 comeback victory over West Bromwich Albion. He played a key role in helping them survive the league and avoid relegation by playing 14 matches, starting nine of those, scoring a goal and assisting three goals.

2017–18 season 
On 22 August 2017, Ayew put up a man of the match performance by scoring a 20-yard strike goal and assisting another for Tammy Abraham's debut goal in Swansea's EFL Cup match against MK Dons. His goal 20-yard effort was described by news outlet BBC as a tremendous strike. Ayew scored his first goal in the 2017–18 season, on 26 August 2017, to help The Swans to a 2–0 victory over his future club Crystal Palace. On 17 January 2018, he scored the opening goal in the Swans' 2–1 FA Cup replay match against Wolverhampton Wanderers. 

At the end of his second season, his only full season with the club, he played 44 matches in all competition and scored 11 goals with 7 coming in the league. He finished the season as the club's top goal scorer and was voted the Players' Player of the season. His solo goal against Wolverhampton Wanderers scored on 17 January 2018 in the FA Cup won the club's goal of the season award. Despite his performance over the season, Swansea was relegated to the championship. This made it the fourth time he had ended as a club's top goal scorer but the club still getting relegated at the end of the season.

Crystal Palace

2018–19 season 
On transfer deadline day in August 2018, Ayew joined Crystal Palace on loan for the 2018–19 season. He made his debut on 1 September 2018, starting in Palace's 2–0 loss to Southampton. On 15 September, he put on an impressive performance against Huddersfield, providing the assist to Wilfried Zaha's goal to earn Palace a 1–0 victory. He was praised for his pressing, hold up play which helped in bringing others into play and allowing the other attackers the opportunity to create chances.

On 2 January 2019, he scored his first league goal for Palace by scoring the opening goal in their 2–0 victory over Wolverhampton Wanderers. Three days after, Ayew came on in the 68th minute for Jairo Riedewald to score a late winner (in the 86th minute) against Grimsby Town in the FA Cup.

2019–20 season 
On 25 July 2019, Ayew made the move permanent with a £2.5m transfer from Swansea City on a three-year deal. Ayew scored his first goal of the season on 24 August 2019 against Manchester United at Old Trafford, netting the opener in the first half against the run of play, latching on to Jeffrey Schlupp's flick-on as Crystal Palace secured an historic 2–1 victory.

On Boxing Day 2019, Ayew scored the match winner in stoppage time as Crystal Palace came from behind to defeat West Ham 2–1. It was Ayew's 21st goal in the Premier League with 20 having been scored in the second half (95%) - the highest such ratio of any player with 20+ goals in the competition's history. At the end of the season, He became the highest goalscorer for Crystal Palace with 9 goals, and won the Crystal Palace Player of the season, Players' Player of the season and Goal of the season awards.

In June 2022, Ayew signed a contract extension keeping him at the club until 2023.

International career

Ayew made his first senior appearance for Ghana on 5 September 2010, in a 3–0 2012 AFCON Qualification match win against Swaziland, at the Somhlolo National Stadium in Lobamba, Swaziland. On 1 June 2012, Ayew scored his first and second international goals in a 2014 World Cup qualification match win against Lesotho, at the Kumasi Sports Stadium in Kumasi, Ghana. In December 2011, Ayew was named to the Ghana national team provisional 25-man squad for the 2012 Africa Cup of Nations, and in January 2012 he was selected for the tournament's 23-man squad.

In June 2014, he was included in the Ghanaian squad for the 2014 World Cup. In Ghana's last warm-up match before the 2014 FIFA World Cup in Brazil on 9 June 2014, Ayew came on as a first-half substitute for the injured Majeed Waris and ended up scoring a hat-trick in a 4–0 victory over South Korea.

Jordan Ayew was part of the Ghanaian team in 2015 Africa Cup of Nations which took place in Equatorial Guinea that took a silver medal as result of losing out to Ivory Coast on a penalty shoot-out whom they clinch the African Cup, which occurred on 8 February 2015.

He was part of the Ghanaian team in the 2021 Africa Cup of Nations that was eliminated at the group stage of the competition.

Personal life
Ayew is the son of Maha Ayew and Abedi Pele. His maternal grandfather, Alhaji A.A. Khadir, is Lebanese. His father, uncles Kwame and Sola, and brothers André and Ibrahim are all current or former professional footballers as well as a sister, Imani. Ayew is a practising Muslim. He is married to Denise Acquah and they have two children.

Career statistics

Club

International

Scores and results list Ghana's goal tally first, score column indicates score after each Ayew goal.

Honours

Marseille
 Ligue 1: 2009–10
 Coupe de la Ligue: 2009–10, 2010–11, 2011–12
 Trophée des Champions: 2010, 2011
Ghana

 African Cup of Nations runner-up: 2015

Individual

 Ghana Player of the Year: 2020

 Crystal Palace Player of the Year: 2019–20
 Crystal Palace Players' Player of the Year: 2019–20
 Crystal Palace Goal of the Season: 2019–20

 Swansea City Players’ Player of the Season: 2017–18

 Swansea City Goal of the Season: 2017–18

References

External links

Profile at the Crystal Palace F.C. website

1991 births
Living people
French sportspeople of Ghanaian descent
Citizens of Ghana through descent
French people of Lebanese descent
Sportspeople of Lebanese descent
Ghanaian Muslims
Footballers from Marseille
French footballers
Ghanaian footballers
Ghanaian people of Lebanese descent
Association football forwards
Lyon La Duchère players
Olympique de Marseille players
FC Sochaux-Montbéliard players
FC Lorient players
Aston Villa F.C. players
Swansea City A.F.C. players
Crystal Palace F.C. players
Ligue 1 players
Premier League players
English Football League players
Ghana under-20 international footballers
Ghana international footballers
2012 Africa Cup of Nations players
2014 FIFA World Cup players
2015 Africa Cup of Nations players
2017 Africa Cup of Nations players
2019 Africa Cup of Nations players
2021 Africa Cup of Nations players
2022 FIFA World Cup players
Naturalized citizens of France
Ghanaian expatriate footballers
Ghanaian expatriate sportspeople in France
Ghanaian expatriate sportspeople in England
Ghanaian expatriate sportspeople in Wales
Expatriate footballers in France
Expatriate footballers in England
Expatriate footballers in Wales
Ayew family